Fritz Wintersteller (21 October 1927 – 15 September 2018) was an Austrian mountaineer who made the first ascent of Broad Peak together with Hermann Buhl, Kurt Diemberger, and Marcus Schmuck in 1957.

Although never a professional climber, he climbed almost every 4000m-mountain in the Alps, including first ascents of Hochkogel (north face) and Wiesspitze. Three other side summits over 4000m were apparently considered by him to be "not beautiful enough" to climb.

In his later years, he made several trips to Alaska for long ski tours and rafting several rivers. As of 2010 he was living in Salzburg, Austria. Due to difficulties with his hips he spent most of his time bicycling.

First ascents
Data from 

 1943
 Kleines Fieberhorn, Southeast tower, variant V 
 Grosses Fieberhorn, South traverse, V- 
 Bratschenkopf, direct South face, V 
 1944
 Zahringkogel, direct West face, V+ 
 Watzmannfrau, Northwest, left traverse, V+ 
 1945
 Hochkogel, Northwest face tower, V 
 1946
 Grosswand, South ridge, 1. descent on skis 
 1948
 Wiesspitze, direct West face, V+ 
 Lehender Kopf, direct West face, V 
 1955
 Falkenstein, Southeast ridge, III 
 Westbyfijell, South face, III and Southeast ridge, II 
 Snökuppelen, North face, IV 
 1957
 Broad Peak 8030m, Forepeak on May 29 
 Broad Peak 8047m on June 9 
 Skil Brum 7420m on June 19

See also
 List of famous Austrians
 List of Austrian mountaineers
 Eight-thousander
 Broad Peak
 Skil Brum
 Alpine style
 List of first ascents

References

External links
Team member of Austrian OEAV Karakoram expedition 1957
Skil Brum on Summitpost.org

1927 births
2018 deaths
Austrian mountain climbers
Sportspeople from Innsbruck